Red Buttress Peak is a rock peak, 1,060 m, surmounting the bold rock mass between the lower Benson and Hunt Glaciers in Victoria Land. Its east face is an immense cliff of red granite. Mapped and given this descriptive name by the 1957 New Zealand Northern Survey Party of the Commonwealth Trans-Antarctic Expedition, 1956–58.

References

Mountains of Victoria Land
Scott Coast